Fairway Markets  is a regional grocery chain on Vancouver Island, British Columbia, Canada.

The ten store chain was founded by Don Yuen in 1963 and employs over 700. The chain is a low cost grocery store with a significant emphasis on ethnic foods.

Founder

Don Yuen was born in China, where his family had operated a grocer store for three generations and came to Canada in 1949 after the family lost their business to communism. Yuen worked at his uncle's store and at a sawmill before embarking on his own store in 1963. Yuen is now Fairway Markets' President.

Locations

Greater Victoria
 272 Gorge Road West, Saanich, BC - original store from 1963
 1521 McKenzie Ave, Saanich, BC
 101-2187 Athlone Court, Oak Bay, BC
 2635 Quadra St, Victoria, BC - former Safeway location
 3651 Shelbourne St, Saanich, BC

Nanaimo
 103-4750 Rutherford Road, Nanaimo, BC

Saanich Peninsula
 7108 West Saanich Road, Brentwood, BC
 2531 Beacon Ave, Sidney, BC

West Shore
 2945 Jacklin Road, Langford, BC
 772 Goldstream Ave, Langford, BC - former Western Foods location

References

External links 

Supermarkets of Canada
1963 establishments in British Columbia
Retail companies established in 1963
Food and drink companies based in British Columbia